William O'Brien was a Scottish footballer who played for Bournemouth & Boscombe Athletic, Port Vale, and Watford in the 1930s.

Career
O'Brien played for Glasgow based St. Anthony's before heading to England to play for Bournemouth & Boscombe Athletic. He joined Port Vale in May 1938. He played a mere four Third Division South games for the "Valiants" in the 1938–39 season, scoring one goal in a 2–1 victory over Newport County at The Old Recreation Ground on 29 August. He left the club in April 1939, and later played for Watford.

Career statistics
Source:

References

Year of birth missing
Year of death missing
Footballers from Glasgow
Scottish footballers
Association football forwards
AFC Bournemouth players
Port Vale F.C. players
Watford F.C. players
English Football League players